John Carleton (September 13, 1899– January 21, 1977) was an American lawyer and competitive skier from New Hampshire. He competed in cross-country skiing and Nordic combined at the 1924 Winter Olympics in Chamonix. He was also a pioneer of alpine skiing in the United States.

Scholastics
Carleton graduated from Hanover High School, Phillips Academy in Andover, Dartmouth College and Magdalen College, Oxford.

While at Dartmouth, he was elected to Phi Beta Kappa, member of Delta Kappa Epsilon fraternity, vice-president of Palaeopitus, vice-president of the Dartmouth Outing Club and member of Cabin and Trail, and the Casque and Gauntlet senior society.

In 1922, he won a Rhodes scholarship, and graduated with a law degree from Oxford's Magdalen College in 1925.

Sports
Gustav Paulsen from Berlin N.H. taught Carleton to somersault on skis off a ski jump, which he first performed as an exhibition at the Dartmouth Winter Field Day in 1910.
 
At Dartmouth he competed on the tennis team each year, and was a 1919 New England doubles champion.
Carleton was captain of the ski team, competing for three years, and was an intercollegiate ski jump champion in 1919 and 1921. He was also on the varsity football team for three years. In 1922 Carleton won the Beck trophy at Lake Placid, and set two New England ski jumping records in N.H. and the Vermont state championship.

As a member (and 1925 captain) of the Oxford ski team, in 1923 he took part in two Oxbridge Ski Races held in Switzerland. He competed for the U.S. in cross-country skiing and Nordic combined at the 1924 Winter Olympics.

In April 11, 1931 along with Charles Proctor, Carleton made the first ski descent of the headwall at Tuckerman Ravine.

In 1932 he competed in the first Eastern Amateur Ski Association downhill race held on Mount Moosilauke.

As Chairman of the New Hampshire Ski Trails Committee of the State Development Commission in 1933, he oversaw the planning of 40 miles of new ski trails cut by the CCC reaching across the state of New Hampshire from the Vermont line to the Maine line.

Military service
World War I U.S. Army Sergeant
World War II U.S. Army Air Corps Captain, promoted to Major

Profession
Carleton was partner in the Manchester, N.H. law firm of “McLane, Carleton, Graf, Green & Brown" and an Assistant Attorney General for N.H. from 1939–45.
He also worked as campaign manager for the unsuccessful Sherman Adams N.H. 1946 Gubernatorial race and was an alternate delegate to the 1948 Republican National Convention from New Hampshire.

Family
He married Alice Prescott Skinner on July 1, 1931 in Paris, France.

Honors
Rhodes scholar 1922
WWII Bronze Star Medal
National Ski Hall of Fame 1968

References

1899 births
1977 deaths
American male ski jumpers
American male Nordic combined skiers
American male cross-country skiers
American male alpine skiers
Olympic Nordic combined skiers of the United States
Olympic cross-country skiers of the United States
Nordic combined skiers at the 1924 Winter Olympics
Cross-country skiers at the 1924 Winter Olympics